São Tomé and Príncipe is a small island country composed of an archipelago located in the Gulf of Guinea of the equatorial Atlantic Ocean. The nation's main islands are São Tomé Island and Príncipe Island, for which the country is named. The nation's geographic coordinates are a latitude of 1°00′N and a longitude of 7°00′E.

Both are part of an extinct volcanic mountain range, which also includes the island of Bioko in Equatorial Guinea to the northeast and Mount Cameroon on the mainland coast further northeast. Its peaks reach  - Pico de São Tomé. Its peaks reach  - Pico de Príncipe. This makes the total land area of the country , about five times the size of Washington, D.C. Both islands are crossed by swift streams radiating down the mountains through lush forest and cropland to the sea. The equator lies immediately south of São Tomé Island, passing through an islet Ilhéu das Rolas.

Climate 

The rainy season runs from October to May.

Climate change 

Between 1950 and 2010, São Tomé and Príncipe experienced an increase of 1.5 °C in average annual temperature due to climate change. The country is considered highly vulnerable to its impacts. Climate change is projected to lead to an increased number of warm days and nights, hotter temperatures and increased precipitation. Sea level rise and saltwater intrusion will be major issues for the islands and climate change will have major impacts on agriculture in the country. The government began developing a National Adaptation Plan in 2022 to implement climate adaptation efforts, with support from the United Nations Environment Programme.

Wildlife

The two islands are oceanic islands which have always been separate from mainland Central Africa and so there is a relatively low diversity of species, restricted to those that have managed to cross the sea to the islands. However the level of endemism is high with many species occurring nowhere else in the world.

Statistics 
Maritime claims:
 Measured from claimed archipelagic baselines
 Exclusive economic zone: 
 Territorial sea: 
 Climate
 Tropical; hot, humid; one rainy season (October to May)
 Terrain
 Volcanic, mountainous
 Elevation extremes
 Lowest point: Atlantic Ocean 
 Natural resources
 Fish, hydropower:

 Environment—current issues
 Deforestation; soil erosion and exhaustion
 Environment—international agreements
 Party to: Biodiversity, Climate Change, Desertification, Environmental Modification, Law of the Sea, Ship Pollution
 Signed, but not ratified: None of the selected agreements

Extreme points 
This is a list of the extreme points of São Tomé and Príncipe, the points that are farther north, south, east or west than any other location.

 Northernmost point - unnamed headland on Ilhéu Bom Bom
 Easternmost point - Ponta Capitão, Príncipe
 Southernmost point - unnamed headland on Ilhéu das Rolas
 Westernmost point - Ponta Azeitona

See also
São Tomé and Príncipe

References